Frank Oswald Thorne  (21 May 1892 – 18 September 1981) was an Anglican colonial bishop in Africa the mid 20th century.

He was educated at St Paul's and Christ Church, Oxford. After World War I service with the Manchester Regiment he was ordained in 1922. His first post was as a curate at All Souls, Clapton Park. In 1925 he joined UMCA and became the first Warden of St Cyprian's Theological College, Tunduru in the Diocese of Masasi. From 1936  to 1961 he was Bishop of Nyasaland. He became a Doctor of Divinity (DD).

References

1892 births
People educated at St Paul's School, London
Alumni of Christ Church, Oxford
Manchester Regiment officers
Recipients of the Military Cross
Anglican missionaries in Tanzania
Anglican bishops of Nyasaland
20th-century Anglican bishops in Africa
Commanders of the Order of the British Empire
Holders of a Lambeth degree
1981 deaths
English Anglican missionaries